Christine Dunford is an American actress from the Bronx, New York.

Life and career

Christine Dunford was born in the Bronx. She graduated from the Bronx High School of Science in 1979, the year that she played a featured role in the school's production of Dark of the Moon. She was also voted class president during her senior year.

She received theater training at the Juilliard School and began her career in the New York theater, cast in Joseph Papp's New York Shakespeare Festival production of Two Gentlemen of Verona at the Delacorte Theater in Central Park.

Dunford spent the next two years working at the Joseph Papp Public Theater in the American premiere of the off-Broadway and Broadway runs of Serious Money and in the lead role of Love's Labours Lost, directed by Gerald Freedman.

Other New York stage appearances include Infidelities at Primary Stages and the title role in Tamara. On the west coast, Dunford starred with Ed Begley, Jr. in David Mamet's The Cryptogram at the Geffen Playhouse. She appeared  and in the Bottom's Dream Theater Company productions of Losing Venice and 7 Blow Jobs, and was directed by fellow Juilliard alumnus Keith David in The Shadow Box at the Edgemar Theater.

Since moving to Los Angeles, Dunford has appeared in over 100 television episodes, both as a series regular (Good Sports, Hudson Street with Tony Danza, Something So Right, Bob, with Bob Newhart, and The Secret Lives of Men) and as a guest star (Law & Order: LA, Harry's Law, Two and a Half Men, Boston Legal, Seinfeld, Frasier, 'Til Death, Without a Trace and others). She also co-starred in Fox's The Please Watch the Jon Lovitz Special in 1992. In 2019, Dunford recurred on The Purge as the evil Andrea Ziv. She also appeared on the mentalist (season 6 episode 3).

On film, Dunford made her debut in the 1989's Slaves of New York. The following year, she appeared in Reversal of Fortune alongside Oscar winner Jeremy Irons. Her other film roles include 1997's Ulee's Gold opposite Peter Fonda, 2000's Love & Basketball, How to Go Out on a Date in Queens, and the award-winning short Dos Corazones.

Dunford is also a playwright, and was invited to perform her series of monologues, Out Loud, at HBO's Aspen Comedy Festival as well as at the Edgemar Theater in Los Angeles. She performed another solo show, Toucan in the Bronx, at the Improv in Los Angeles.

In addition to her work on stage and screen, Dunford is a voice artist on several animated series as well as television and radio commercials. She provides narration for documentary films and museum installments, and does voice work for video games in the Mass Effect, Lord of the Rings, Civilization, Hitman, and X-COM series, as well as Warhammer 40,000: Dawn of War, EverQuest, and Infamous Second Son.

References

External links

American actresses
Living people
Year of birth missing (living people)
People from the Bronx
21st-century American women